William Downe Gillon (31 August 1801 – 7 October 1846) was a Scottish Whig politician.

The son of Andrew Gillon of Wallhouse (Linlithgowhire (now West Lothian)), Lieut-Col. in the Scots Fusilier Guards and Mary Anne Downe, daughter of William Downe of Downe Hall, Dorset, he was educated at Trinity College, Cambridge.

He was elected at the 1831 general election as the Member of Parliament (MP) for the Lanark Burghs.
That constituency was abolished by the Scottish Reform Act 1832, and at the 1832 general election he was returned for the new Falkirk Burghs. He was returned unopposed in 1835 and 1837, but defeated at the 1841 general election by the Conservative Party candidate William Baird.

William Downe Gillon was a major beneficiary of his elder cousin John Gillon's (d. 1809) will, including profits coming from the plantation at Wallhouse, Dominica, housing 137 enslaved people in 1817. This gave Downe Gillon an annuity of £500 per annum and the purchase of Herstmonceux Castle.

Freemasonry
Gillon was Initiated into Scottish Freemasonry in the Lodge of Holyrood House (St Luke's), No.44, on 29 November 1828. He was Master of the Lodge from 1843 until his death in 1846. He was the first Provincial Grand Master of Linlithgowshire, the name remains unchanged for Masonic purposes, and served 1832 until his death. His son, Andrew (1823-1888), was also a Scottish Freemason and Affiliated to his late father's Lodge in 1849.

References

External links 
 

1801 births
1846 deaths
Alumni of Trinity College, Cambridge
Members of the Parliament of the United Kingdom for Scottish constituencies
UK MPs 1831–1832
UK MPs 1832–1835
UK MPs 1835–1837
UK MPs 1837–1841
Scottish Freemasons